Iyanbito is an unincorporated community and census-designated place (CDP) in McKinley County, New Mexico, United States, on the Navajo Nation. It was first listed as a CDP prior to the 2020 census.

It is bordered to the west by the Church Rock CDP and to the south by the Southern Transcon line of the BNSF Railway. Mesa Butte, elevation , rises to the north of the CDP.

New Mexico State Road 118 (Historic Route 66) and Interstate 40 pass just south of Iyanbito, leading west to Gallup and southeast  to Grants.

Demographics

Education
It is in Gallup-McKinley County Public Schools.

It is zoned to Catherine A. Miller Elementary School in Church Rock, Kennedy Middle School, and Hiroshi Miyamura High School.

References 

Census-designated places in McKinley County, New Mexico
Census-designated places in New Mexico
Navajo Nation